'Nduja is a spicy, spreadable pork sausage from the region of Calabria in Southern Italy. It is similar to sobrassada from the Balearic Islands in Spain, to the Piedmontese salam d'la duja and to the French andouille. It is Calabria's contribution to the many types of Italian salumi, and originates from the area around the small Calabrian town of Spilinga.

'Nduja is made using meat from the head (minus the jowls, which are used for guanciale), trimmings from various meat cuts, some clean skin, fatback, and roasted Calabrian chilli peppers, which give 'nduja its characteristic fiery taste. These are all minced together, then stuffed in large sausage casings and smoked, creating a soft large sausage, from where the spicy mixture later is scooped out as needed. 'Nduja is mainly served with slices of bread or with ripe cheese. Its unique taste makes it suitable for a variety of dishes. For example, it can be added to pasta sauces. It is sold in jars or as thick slices from the soft 'nduja sausage. In the past 'nduja was a mix of remnants of meat, eaten by poor people in Southern Italy.

In the US and the UK, 'Nduja's popularity boomed around 2015–2016, and it was featured in dishes at restaurants including New York City's Spotted Pig and London's Temple and Sons.

See also
 Soppressata
 Harissa
 List of sausages

References

External link

Italian sausages
Cuisine of Calabria
Salumi
Pork dishes